Chlorphenamine (CP, CPM), also known as chlorpheniramine, is an antihistamine used to treat the symptoms of allergic conditions such as allergic rhinitis (hay fever). It is taken by mouth. The medication takes effect within two hours and lasts for about 4-6 hours.

Common side effects include sleepiness, restlessness, and weakness. Other side effects may include dry mouth and wheeziness. It is a first-generation antihistamine and works by blocking the H1 receptor.

Chlorpheniramine was patented in 1948 and came into medical use in 1949. It is available as a generic medication and over the counter.

Medical uses

Combination products
Chlorphenamine is often combined with phenylpropanolamine to form an allergy medication with both antihistamine and decongestant properties, though phenylpropanolamine is no longer available in the US after studies showed it increased the risk of stroke in young women. Chlorphenamine remains available with no such risk.

Chlorphenamine may be combined with the opioid hydrocodone. Chlorphenamine/dihydrocodeine immediate-release syrups are also marketed. The antihistamine is helpful in cases where allergy or common cold is the reason for the cough; it is also a potentiator of opioids, allowing enhanced suppression of cough, analgesia, and other effects from a given quantity of the drug by itself. In various places in the world, cough and cold preparations containing codeine and chlorphenamine are available.

In the drug Coricidin, chlorphenamine is combined with the cough suppressant dextromethorphan. In the drug Cêgripe, chlorphenamine is combined with the analgesic paracetamol.

Side effects
The adverse effects include drowsiness, dizziness, confusion, constipation, anxiety, nausea, blurred vision, restlessness, decreased coordination, dry mouth, shallow breathing, hallucinations, irritability, problems with memory or concentration, tinnitus and trouble urinating.

Chlorphenamine produces less sedation than other first-generation antihistamines.

A large study on people 65 years old or older, linked the development of Alzheimer's disease and other forms of dementia to the "higher cumulative" use of chlorphenamine and other first-generation antihistamines, due to their anticholinergic properties.

Pharmacology

Pharmacodynamics

Chlorphenamine acts primarily as a potent H1 antihistamine. It is specifically a potent inverse agonist of the histamine H1 receptor. The drug is also commonly described as possessing weak anticholinergic activity by acting as an antagonist of the muscarinic acetylcholine receptors. The dextrorotatory stereoisomer, dexchlorpheniramine, has been reported to possess Kd values of 15 nM for the H1 receptor and 1,300 nM for the muscarinic acetylcholine receptors in human brain tissue. The smaller the Kd value, the greater the binding affinity of the ligand for its target.

In addition to acting as an inverse agonist at the H1 receptor, chlorphenamine has been found to act as a serotonin reuptake inhibitor (Kd = 15.2 nM for the serotonin transporter). It has only weak affinity for the norepinephrine and dopamine transporters (Kd = 1,440 nM and 1,060 nM, respectively). A similar antihistamine, brompheniramine, led to the discovery of the selective serotonin reuptake inhibitor (SSRI) zimelidine.

A study found that dexchlorphenamine had Ki values for the human cloned H1 receptor of 2.67 to 4.81 nM while levchlorphenamine had Ki values of 211 to 361 nM for this receptor, indicating that dexchlorphenamine is the active enantiomer. Another study found that dexchlorphenamine had a Ki value of 20 to 30 μM for the muscarinic acetylcholine receptor using rat brain tissue while levchlorphenamine had a Ki value of 40 to 50 μM for this receptor, indicating that both enantiomers have very low affinity for it.

Pharmacokinetics
The elimination half-life of chlorphenamine has variously ranged between 13.9 and 43.4 hours in adults following a single dose in clinical studies.

Chemistry
Chlorphenamine is an alkylamine and is a part of a series of antihistamines including pheniramine (Naphcon) and its halogenated derivatives including fluorpheniramine, dexchlorphenamine (Polaramine), brompheniramine (Dimetapp), dexbrompheniramine (Drixoral), deschlorpheniramine, and iodopheniramine. The halogenated alkylamine antihistamines all exhibit optical isomerism, and chlorphenamine in the indicated products is racemic chlorphenamine maleate, whereas dexchlorphenamine is the dextrorotary stereoisomer.

Synthesis
There are several patented methods for the synthesis of chlorphenamine. In one example, 4-chlorophenylacetonitrile is reacted with 2-chloropyridine in the presence of sodium amide to form 4-chlorophenyl(2-pyridyl)acetonitrile. Alkylating this with 2-dimethylaminoethylchloride in the presence of sodium amide gives γ-(4-chlorphenyl)-γ-cyano-N,N-dimethyl-2-pyridinepropanamine, the hydrolysis and decarboxylation of which lead to chlorphenamine.

A second method boom starts from pyridine, which undergoes alkylation by 4-chlorophenylacetonitrile, giving 2-(4-chlorobenzyl)pyridine. Alkylating this with 2-dimethylaminoethylchloride in the presence of sodium amide gives chlorphenamine.

Society and culture

Names

Brand names have included Demazin, Allerest 12 Hour, Codral Nighttime, Chlornade, Contac 12 Hour, Exchange Select Allergy Multi-Symptom, A. R. M. Allergy Relief, Ordrine, Ornade Spansules, Piriton, Teldrin, Triaminic, and Tylenol Cold/Allergy.

References 

Antidepressants
Anxiolytics
Chlorobenzenes
CYP2D6 inhibitors
H1 receptor antagonists
Local anesthetics
Muscarinic antagonists
2-Pyridyl compounds
Serotonin reuptake inhibitors
Sigma receptor ligands
Sodium channel blockers
World Health Organization essential medicines